Maloye Ibrayevo (Kese İbray) is a rural locality (a selo) and the administrative centre of Ibrayevsky Selsoviet, Aurgazinsky District, Bashkortostan, Russia. The population was 127 as of 2010. There are 2 streets.

Geography 
Maloye Ibrayevo is located 28 km northeast of Tolbazy (the district's administrative centre) by road. Staroye Ibrayevo is the nearest rural locality.

References 

Rural localities in Aurgazinsky District